Psilonyx is a genus of robber flies (insects in the family Asilidae). There are about 14 described species in Psilonyx.

Species
These 14 species belong to the genus Psilonyx:

 Psilonyx annulatus (Say, 1823) i c g b
 Psilonyx annuliventris Hsia, 1949 c g
 Psilonyx arawak Farr, 1963 c g
 Psilonyx dorsiniger Zhang & Yang, 2009 c g
 Psilonyx flavican Shi, 1993 c g
 Psilonyx flavicoxa Zhang & Yang, 2009 c g
 Psilonyx hsiai Shi, 1993 c g
 Psilonyx humeralis Hsia, 1949 c g
 Psilonyx macropygialis (Williston, 1901) c g
 Psilonyx magnicauda (Curran, 1934) c g
 Psilonyx migricoxa Hsia, 1949 g
 Psilonyx minimensis (Matsumura, 1916) c g
 Psilonyx nigricoxa Hsia, 1949 c g
 Psilonyx zephyrus Scarbrough & Page, 2005 c g

Data sources: i = ITIS, c = Catalogue of Life, g = GBIF, b = Bugguide.net

References

Further reading

 
 
 

Asilidae genera
Articles created by Qbugbot